Tolowa Dunes State Park is a  California State Park located in Del Norte County, on the North Coast of California.

The park encompasses Lake Earl, Lake Tolowa, and a significant portion of the relatively large coastal plain around them including Yontocket, California.

Tolowa Dunes State Park is a sanctuary for bird life. It is easily reached by US 101, and is just north of Crescent City.

The name refers to the Tolowa people, an indigenous peoples of California tribe whose homeland was in the area, and relatively undisturbed previous to American colonization in the 1850s.

See also
California coastal prairie

References

State parks of California
Parks in Del Norte County, California
Crescent City, California
1925 establishments in California
Protected areas established in 1925